Irfan Khan may refer to:

Irrfan Khan (1967–2020), Indian actor
Irfan Khan (Indian cricketer) (born 1988), Indian cricketer
Irfan Khan (Pakistani cricketer) (born 2002), Pakistani cricketer
Irfan Khan (singer) (born 1982), Pakistani Pushto singer
Irfan Khan (footballer)
Irfan Khan Pathan (born 1984), Indian former cricketer
Irfan Khan, a suspect in the 2005 Ram Janmabhoomi attack
Irfan Saadat Khan (born 1963), Pakistani jurist